Neyzan is a village in Geshmiran Rural District, in the Central District of Manujan County, Kerman Province, Iran. At the 2006 census, its population was 124, in 32 families.

References 

Populated places in Manujan County